Doron Bell Jr. (born December 8, 1973 in Montreal, Quebec) is a Canadian actor, musician, and singer. He is known for his music, acting and voice work; he voiced the character Waldo in the Netflix animated series Dinotrux as well as many other animation projects.  He once released an indie-reggae music single "Lightning" that featured Jamaican singer and Grammy winner Beenie Man. Bell also starred in the Lifetime original movie Toni Braxton: Unbreak My Heart as Scott Rhodes, the R&B star's manager. In spring 2019, Bell was cast as one of the Isley Brothers (Rudolph Isley) alongside R&B superstar Jason Derulo as Ron Isley in the film Spinning Gold starring Wiz Khalifa, Richard Dreyfuss, Peyton List and Neil Patrick Harris. He is also the older brother of fellow actor Dexter Bell.

Selected filmography
 Tobot Athlon - Beta (voice) (2019–present)
 Dinotrux - Waldo, "The Silent Dude" Otto, Kelper (voice) (2015–present)
 Lego Ninjago: Masters of Spinjitzu - Griffin Turner (voice) (2015–present)
 Supernoobs - Shope's father (voice) (2015)
 Pirate Express - Booli (voice) (2015)
 My Little Pony: Friendship Is Magic - Trenderhoof (voice) (2014); Cattail (voice) (2017)
 Voltron Force − Vince (voice) (2011)
 Cosmic Quantum Ray - Lucas (voice) (2010)
 George of the Jungle - Big Mitch (voice) (2007)
 Deadly Skies - Guard Stevens (2006)
 Firehouse Tales - Additional voices (2005)
 Class of the Titans - Odie (voice) (2005)
 Alien Racers - G'rog (voice) (2005)
 ToddWorld - Benny, Asante (voice) (2004)
 Def Jam Fight for NY - Hero (Rough)/Solo (video game voice) (2004)
 G.I. Joe: Valor vs. Venom - Tunnel Rat (voice) (2004)
 Scooby-Doo 2: Monsters Unleashed - Drummer (2004)
 Transformers: Energon - Cliffjumper (voice) (2004)
 G.I. Joe: Spy Troops - Tunnel Rat (voice) (2003)
 Hot Wheels Highway 35 World Race - Alec "Hud" Wood (2003)

External links
 
 
 Official Site

1973 births
Living people
Male actors from Montreal
Anglophone Quebec people
Canadian male television actors
Canadian male voice actors
Black Canadian male actors
Canadian people of Jamaican descent
Singers from Montreal
21st-century Canadian male singers